Popkum, also known as Popkum Village, is a rural farming and tourism based community in the Fraser Valley Regional District, just east of Chilliwack, British Columbia, Canada. The community is named after the Indian reserve of the Popkum First Nation, which is located on the Fraser River nearby. The name is derived from the Halq'eméylem word Pópkw'em meaning "puffballs."

Demographics 

(according to Statistics Canada 2001 census)
Population: 1,032
Growth Rate (1996-2001): 14.5% 
Total Private Dwellings: 401
Area: 221.58 km2. 
Density: 4.7 people per km2.

Industry 

The area includes a variety of tourist attractions including Bridal Veil Falls, Cheam Lake Wetlands, Tam's Enchanted farm (Closed), Bridal Falls WaterPark and Popkum Motor Park (British Columbia's only off-road recreational vehicle (ORV) park).

References

Unincorporated settlements in British Columbia
Populated places in the Fraser Valley Regional District
Populated places on the Fraser River
Designated places in British Columbia